Kennedy Ihenacho (born December 16, 1990) is a Nigerian former footballer. He moved to Kuwait after his contract expiration with the VSI TAMPA BAY FC in the United States USL league 2013 season. Kennedy Ihenacho has played for Roi Et FC in Thailand, Niger Tornadoes FC and Dolphins FC both in Nigeria.

Career
Kennedy received his football education in the famous Pepsi Football Academy in Nigeria after graduation from the academy he started his first professional exhibition by playing for Niger Tornadoes FC and Dolphins FC in the Nigerian Premier League. Based on his ambition to face bigger challenges in his career he was spotted by an agent that took him to the Thai league where he secured a two years contract. Kennedy Ihenacho after his contract expiration jetted into the United States on an invitation by the United States indoor soccer giants the Milwaukee Wave Indoor soccer club where he played for a few months and later settled in a short term contract with the VSI Tampa Bay FC in the USL.

Position
Kennedy's preferred role is in the central defense and also a utility is the defense. He showcases his interceptions and timing in tackles and his aerial dominance, and  possesses a playing trademark as an attacking sweeper and scores almost in every game.

References

1990 births
Living people
People from Owerri
Nigerian footballers
Association football defenders
Pepsi Football Academy players
Niger Tornadoes F.C. players
Dolphin F.C. (Nigeria) players
Kennedy Ihenacho
Burgan SC players
Nigeria Professional Football League players
Nigerian expatriate footballers
Nigerian expatriate sportspeople in Thailand
Nigerian expatriate sportspeople in Kuwait
Expatriate footballers in Thailand
Expatriate footballers in Kuwait
Sportspeople from Imo State